First Presbyterian Church is a historic church at 210 N. Spring Street in Murfreesboro, Tennessee.

The congregation was founded on April 10, 1812. Its original building was used a hospital by both sides in the Civil War and was destroyed. It was replaced by a new building completed in 1867. After the building was extensively damaged by a tornado in 1913, it was restored, with modifications to the design of the roof and structure. The building was added to the National Register of Historic Places with a recorded completion date of 1914, corresponding to the post-tornado reconstruction. The new building was designed by Nashville architect D. Anderson Dickey and built by local contractors Maugans & Bell.

References

External links
 First Presbyterian Church, Murfreesboro

Presbyterian churches in Tennessee
Churches on the National Register of Historic Places in Tennessee
Neoclassical architecture in Tennessee
Churches completed in 1914
20th-century Presbyterian church buildings in the United States
Buildings and structures in Murfreesboro, Tennessee
Churches in Rutherford County, Tennessee
National Register of Historic Places in Rutherford County, Tennessee
Neoclassical church buildings in the United States